The smooth-sided toad or spotted toad (Rhaebo guttatus), formerly known as Bufo guttatus, is a species of toad in the family Bufonidae. It is found in the Amazonian Bolivia, Brazil, Colombia, Ecuador, Peru, and Venezuela, as well as the Guianas (French Guiana, Guyana, and Suriname). Specimens from southern Peru, Bolivia, and Brazil might represent Rhaebo ecuadorensis described in 2012.

Description
Males growth to about  snout–vent length. The dorsal color is cream colored or very light brown to reddish brown. The belly is a darker shade. The species has a characteristically prominent preocular ridge that is present even in juveniles.

The smooth sided toad secretes a toxin from a gland behind their eyes known as a bufotoxin, it has been known to cause heart failure in humans if ingested. This toxin is the toad's main line of defense against predators.

Habitat and conservation
Its natural habitats are tropical moist lowland forests, in particular mature gallery forests. It occurs on the ground or in deep leaf-litter on the forest floor. It is locally threatened by habitat loss.

References

Rhaebo
Amphibians of Bolivia
Amphibians of Brazil
Amphibians of Colombia
Amphibians of Ecuador
Amphibians of French Guiana
Amphibians of Guyana
Amphibians of Peru
Amphibians of Suriname
Amphibians of Venezuela
Taxonomy articles created by Polbot
Amphibians described in 1799